Joshua Abdulai Koroma (born 8 November 1998) is an English professional footballer who plays as a forward for  club Huddersfield Town.

Career

Leyton Orient
Koroma made his first-team debut for Leyton Orient on 9 April 2016 as a second-half substitute in a 3–0 league defeat away to Barnet. He scored his first goals on 4 March 2017 with a hat-trick in a 4–0 win away to Newport County.

Huddersfield Town
Koroma signed for newly relegated Championship club Huddersfield Town on 21 June 2019 on a three-year contract with the option of a further year for an undisclosed fee.

On 31 January 2020, Koroma joined Rotherham United on a six-month loan deal.

2020–21
He scored his first goal for Huddersfield in a 2–1 win at Swansea City on 17 October 2020. On the 8 December he scored for the third consecutive home game in the 2–0 home victory over Sheffield Wednesday. In the same game he injured a hamstring and was out for over 4 months.
He returned for the final four games of the season, in which he scored in the away 5–2 defeat to Blackburn Rovers and 2–2 draw away to Reading FC.

Portsmouth (loan)
On 1 September 2022, Koroma joined EFL League One side Portsmouth on a season-long loan, reuniting him with Danny Cowley, who managed him at Huddersfield. On 11 January 2023, Portsmouth opted to end Koroma's loan.

Personal life
Koroma is of Sierra Leonean descent.

Career statistics

Honours
Leyton Orient
National League: 2018–19
FA Trophy runner-up: 2018–19

References

External links

1998 births
Living people
Footballers from Southwark
English footballers
Association football forwards
Leyton Orient F.C. players
Huddersfield Town A.F.C. players
Rotherham United F.C. players
Portsmouth F.C. players
English Football League players
National League (English football) players
Black British sportspeople
English sportspeople of Sierra Leonean descent